Tonči Zonjić is a Croatian comic book artist.

Career
Zonjić started out as an illustrator at the age of 15 and got into comics by creating a fanzine called Pipci! (Tentacles!) in 2004. His first full finished book - an educational story about sea diving for kids that he colored and lettered himself - still hasn't been published since its completion in 2006. In Croatia, he's been working on several projects with Darko Macan as well as storyboards, advertisements, book covers, newspaper portraits and various other comic strips.

Zonjić entered the American market in 2008 as one of the artists for Marvel's The Immortal Iron Fist series by Ed Brubaker and Matt Fraction.

Personal life
Zonjić currently resides in Toronto, Ontario, Canada.

Bibliography
Interior comic work includes:
 Q strip (with Darko Macan (except for #21), anthology):
 "Slatka" (back cover strip, in #12, 2006)
 "Port Silver" (in #13-14 and 16-17, 2006–2007)
 "Mono Johnson: Milijun" (script and art, in #21, 2007)
 The Immortal Iron Fist (with Ed Brubaker and Matt Fraction, Marvel):
 "The Seven Capital Cities of Heaven: Round 6" (with David Aja and Kano, in #13, 2008)
 "The Seven Capital Cities of Heaven: Round 7" (with Kano and Clay Mann, in #14, 2008)
 "Escape from the Eighth City: Chapter 2" (with Travel Foreman and Timothy Green II, in #23, 2009)
 Hrvatski Velikani Volume 2: "Nikola Tesla" (with Darko Macan, anthology graphic novel, Astoria, 2008)
 Daredevil vol. 2 #115: "Lady Bullseye: Conclusion" (with Ed Brubaker and Michael Lark, Marvel, 2009)
 Popgun Volume 3: "Ever Upward" (script and art, anthology graphic novel, Image, 2009)
 Marvel Divas #1-4 (with Roberto Aguirre-Sacasa, Marvel, 2009)
 Dark Reign: The Cabal: "Loki: Dinner with Doom" (with Peter Milligan, anthology one-shot, Marvel, 2009)
 Superman 80-Page Giant vol. 2 #1: "Patience-Centered Care" (with Kathryn Immonen, anthology, DC Comics, 2010)
 Heralds #1-4 (with Kathryn Immonen, James Harren and Emma Ríos, Marvel, 2010)
 JSA 80-Page Giant: "Ignorance is Bliss" (with Justin Peniston, anthology one-shot, DC Comics, 2010)
 Madman: All-New Giant-Size Super Ginchy Special!: "Bang!" (script and art, anthology one-shot, Image, 2011)
 Jake Ellis (with Nathan Edmondson, Image):
 Who is Jake Ellis? #1-5 (2011)
 Where is Jake Ellis? #1-5 (with Jordan Gibson (#5), 2012–2015)
 Lobster Johnson (with Mike Mignola and John Arcudi, Dark Horse):
 The Burning Hand #1-5 (2012)
 Caput Mortuum (one-shot, 2012)
 Get the Lobster! #1-5 (2013–2014)
 Metal Monsters of Midtown #1-3 (2016)
 The Pirate's Ghost #1-3 (2017)
 Zabava za celu porodicu #25: "O ljubavi (i još ponekim demonima)" (with Vladimir Tadić, co-feature, Lavirint, 2012)
 Dracula World Order: The Beginning (with Ian Brill, Rahsan Ekedal, Gabriel Hardman and Declan Shalvey, one-shot, 2012)
 Zero #9: "Marina" (with Ales Kot, Image, 2014)
 Think of a City page 35 (script and art, Internet art project, 2015)
 Edge of Spider-Geddon #3: "Spider-Ben and Petey" (with Jason Latour, Marvel, 2018)
 Hellboy Winter Special #3: "The Empty Chair" (script and art, Dark Horse, 2018)
 Skulldigger + Skeleton Boy #1-6 (with Jeff Lemire, Dark Horse, 2019–2021)

Covers only
 Starborn #5 (Boom! Studios, 2011)
 Betrayal of the Planet of the Apes #1 (Boom! Studios, 2011)
 Dark Horse Presents vol. 2 #11 (Dark Horse, 2012)
 The Mystery Boys #2 (Dead Universe, 2012)
 The Creep #3 (Dark Horse, 2012)
 Lobster Johnson (Dark Horse):
 Prayer of Neferu #1 (2012)
 A Scent of Lotus #1-2 (2013)
 A Chain Forged in Life #1 (2015)
 The Glass Mantis #1 (2015)
 The Forgotten Man #1 (2016)
 Garden of Bones #1 (2017)
 Mangekyō #1 (2017)
 Zero #14 (Image, 2015)
 Last Sons of America #1-4 (Boom! Studios, 2015–2016)
 The Astonishing Ant-Man #11 (Marvel, 2016)
 Ninja-K #1-3, 5-9 (Valiant, 2017–2018)
 Shadowman vol. 5 #1-11 (Valiant, 2018–2019)
 Crimson Lotus #1-5 (Dark Horse, 2018–2019)
 Incursion #1-4 (Valiant, 2019)
 Black Badge #8 (Boom! Studios, 2019)
 Pope Hats #6 (AdHouse Books, 2019)
 Star Wars: Age of Resistance – Captain Phasma #1 (Marvel, 2019)
 Strange Skies Over East Berlin #1 (Boom! Studios, 2019)
 The Visitor #4 (Valiant, 2020)

References

External links
 
 Tonči Zonjić's blog

Living people
Croatian comics artists
1986 births